The Cambridge Poetry Festival, founded by Richard Berengarten (also known as Richard Burns), was an international biennale for poetry held in Cambridge, England, between 1975–1985.

The festival was founded in an attempt to combine as many aspects as possible of this form of art. Thus Michael Hamburger could, for example, recite his English interpretations of Paul Celan's poetry in the presence of Gisèle Lestrange and a surprisingly large audience at an art gallery bestowed on her engravings. The last biennale in 1985 included a number of events to mark Ezra Pound's centenary, including the exhibition Pound's Artists: Ezra Pound and the Visual Arts in London, Paris and Italy at Kettle's Yard (later also shown at the Tate Gallery) and was accompanied by a special issue of the magazine PN Review.

Literature 
 Richard Berengarten, "The Cambridge Poetry Festival: 35 years after", Cambridge Literary Review, I/1 (Michaelmas, 2009)
 Martin Booth: British poetry 1964 to 1984: driving through the barricades (Routledge, 1985).
 Rolf Dieter Brinkmann: The Last One: Readings / Autorenlesungen, Cambridge Poetry Festival 1975 [Audio-book] [CD], 59 min. (Intermedium Records, 2005)

References

External links 
 Elizabeth Thomas and Richard Burns, 'Cambridge Poetry Festival', The New York Review of Books, October 3 1974
 Rat Palace by Tom Pickard, 19 April 1977

Recurring events established in 1975
1985 disestablishments in England
Festivals in Cambridge
Literary festivals in England
Poetry festivals in the United Kingdom